The Wiknatanja (Wik Ngathanya) were an indigenous Australian people, one of the Wik tribes of the Cape York Peninsula of northern Queensland.

Languages
Wiknatanja was one of the Wik languages.

Country

Alternative names
 Wik-Ngartona.
 Wik-Natan.
 Wik-ngatona.

Notes

Citations

Sources

Aboriginal peoples of Queensland